"Soul Twist" is a 1962 instrumental crossover single for saxophonist, King Curtis.  His debut single on the R&B charts was his most successful, hitting number one for two weeks.  "Soul Twist" crossed over to the top 40, where it was one of three singles by King Curtis to make the chart.

Chart positions

See also
List of number-one R&B singles of 1962 (U.S.)

References

Songs about soul
Songs about music
Songs about dancing
Twist (dance)
1962 singles
1960s instrumentals
1962 songs